Update rule may refer to:

 Update rules I and II in quantum mechanics
 Update rule in Bayesian inference